Hoplocryptanthus caracensis is a species of flowering plant in the family Bromeliaceae, endemic to Brazil (the state of Minas Gerais). It was first described in 1992 as Cryptanthus caracensis.

References

Bromelioideae
Flora of Brazil
Plants described in 1992